Kaisa Collin (born 16 April 1997) is a Finnish footballer who plays as a forward for AIK and the Finland national team. She previously played for HJK and PK-35 of the Naisten Liiga.

Club career
In January 2019 Collin agreed a transfer from PK-35 to Eskilstuna United DFF of the Swedish Damallsvenskan.

International career
Collin made her debut for the Finland women's national team on 7 April 2017, in a 1–0 defeat by Poland in Pruszków.

International goals

References

External links
 
 Kaisa Collin at Football Association of Finland (SPL) 
 
 

1997 births
Finnish women's footballers
Finnish expatriate footballers
Living people
Finland women's international footballers
Kansallinen Liiga players
Eskilstuna United DFF players
Damallsvenskan players
Expatriate women's footballers in Sweden
Finnish expatriate sportspeople in Sweden
Helsingin Jalkapalloklubi (women) players
PK-35 Vantaa (women) players
Women's association football forwards